University of Extremadura (in ) is a Spanish public university in Extremadura (Badajoz and Cáceres).

It was founded in 1973 by Decree 991/1973, May 10 (BOE May 18) of the Ministry of Education and Science of Spain.
Currently the University of Extremadura offers 64 Bachelor's Degrees and 32 Master's Degrees in many different fields of knowledge.

Together with the University of Cantabria, Castilla-La Mancha, Balearic Islands, La Rioja, Navarra, Oviedo, Zaragoza and the Basque Country, form the Group G9 of Universities (formed by the universities that are alone in their autonomous community).

Structure 

The University of Extremadura is distributed into four different campuses: Badajoz, Cáceres, Mérida and Plasencia. Each campus has different specialities:

Badajoz Campus 
 Faculty of Science (Mathematics, Chemistry, Physics, Chemical Engineering, Biology, Environmental Sciences, Biotechnology, Enology).
 School of Industrial Engineerings (Industrial Engineering, Materials Engineering, Electronic Engineering, Biomedical Engineering, Renewable Energies, Mechanical Engineering, Electrical Engineering).
 Faculty of Economics Sciences.
 Faculty of Education.
 Faculty of Medicine.

Cáceres Campus 
 Faculty of Laws
 Faculty of Veterinary
 Faculty of Sport Science
 Faculty of Teacher Training
 Faculty of Nursing and Occupational Therapy
 School of Technology
 Faculty of Philosophy and Letters
 Faculty of Business and Tourism

Mérida Campus 
Mérida Campus offers five different bachelor's degrees: Industrial Design Engineering, Telecommunication Engineering, Information Technologies, Geomatics and Topography, and Nursing (in collaboration with Mérida's Hospital).

Plasencia Campus 
Plasencia Campus offers the Degree in Forestry Engineering, Podiatry and Administration and Business Management.

UEx Virtual Campus 
The Virtual Campus of the University of Extremadura (CVUE) complements the education that students receive in the classroom. Based on the New Technologies of Information and Communication aims to provide to teachers, students and administration and services staff, tools that extend and enhance the teaching-learning processes and teamwork. The UEX encourages virtual collaboration to be successfully with these processes, breaking with traditional models.

References

External links

Campus Virtual de la Universidad de Extremadura 

 
Extremadura